As a general rule, modern Norwegian does not use exonyms for names with endonyms in Latin script. Historically, several Danish/German exonyms have been in use, due to the Danish roots of the Bokmål variety of Norwegian, but these exonyms should be considered archaic, and are no longer used officially.

Albania

Austria

Belgium

Cuba

Denmark
Places in Denmark are in Norway spelled like in Danish. Also, for places with Aa, which during the latter half of the 20th century were spelled Å in Denmark, and then changed back to aa. Thus, Aabenraa and some more places are spelled with aa also in Norway. The same sound is spelled Å for places in Norway.

Estonia

Finland

Until recently, most people tended to use the official Swedish names in Norwegian. The Swedish names are not exonyms, since both Finnish and Swedish are official languages in Finland, with many towns, cities and regions having two, often very different, official names. In recent years, however, the use of Finnish place names have gained some popularity in Norwegian.

Germany

Greece

Italy

Netherlands

Russia

Sweden
Newspapers in Norway often, but absolutely not always, write all ä as æ (sometimes e) and all ö as ø, probably because ä and ö were historically lacking on Norwegian typewriters. For example: Göteborg (Gothenburg) is in Norway written Göteborg or Gøteborg.
Some places have genuine Norwegian names because they were originally part of Norway:

United Kingdom

See also

List of European exonyms

References

Vigleik Leira, Geografiske navn i flere språk (2006).

External links
Official spellings for names of foreign places

Norwegian language
Lists of exonyms